Carlos Andrés Rivas Gómez (born 22 August 1991) is a Colombian footballer who plays as a winger for Llaneros.

References

External links

Santa Fe Futbol
Colombia AS profile (Spanish)
Correcaminos UAT

1991 births
Liga MX players
Colombian footballers
Colombian expatriate footballers
Living people
Association football forwards
Valledupar F.C. footballers
Independiente Medellín footballers
Patriotas Boyacá footballers
Correcaminos UAT footballers
Independiente Santa Fe footballers
América de Cali footballers
Jaguares de Córdoba footballers
Llaneros F.C. players
Colombian expatriate sportspeople in Mexico
Expatriate footballers in Mexico
Sportspeople from Antioquia Department
Colombian expatriate sportspeople in Kuwait
Expatriate footballers in Kuwait
Kuwait Premier League players
Al-Yarmouk SC (Kuwait) players